Fujinuma is a Japanese surname. Notable people with the surname include:

, Japanese table tennis player
, Japanese footballer

See also
Fujinuma Dam, a dam in Sukagawa, Fukushima Prefecture, Japan

Japanese-language surnames